Full Time Sports is a Brazilian professional auto racing team currently competing in Stock Car Pro Series, Stock Series, and F4 Brazil. The team is based in Vinhedo, São Paulo. The team has won the Stock Car Brasil championship twice, with Rubens Barrichello in 2014 (with Chevrolet) and in 2022 (with Toyota).

Timeline

References

External links
  

Stock Car Brasil teams
Brazilian auto racing teams
Auto racing teams established in 2004
Formula Renault teams